Lionel William Fulcher B.Sc. (3 January 1866–11 May 1945) was a British philatelist who co-edited, with Stanley Phillips, Gibbons Stamp Monthly, was Vice President of the International Philatelic Union and was a key figure in the Fiscal Philatelic Society. He was an expert on the early stamps of Japan and also studied Venezuela, Peru, Nicaragua, Papal States and Norway.

He was for a time the editor of Morley's Philatelic Journal, A Monthly Paper For Collectors of Postage, Revenue, Telegraph and Railway stamps and also of The Philatelic Record.

Fulcher was a member of the Royal Philatelic Society London from 1901 where he also became the Honorary Librarian and was a frequent exhibitor at meetings.

In 1921, Fulcher was entered on the Roll of Distinguished Philatelists.

Outside philately
Professionally, Fulcher was employed as an Assistant Keeper at the Science Museum, South Kensington, retiring in 1928.

Publications
Catalogue of the revenue stamps of Spain and Colonies, including the American occupation and revolutionary issues. London: Walter Morley, 1902.
Roman States. Philatelic Record, 1912.
The Postage Stamps of Venezuela. (Reprinted from the London Philatelist.) [With plates.]. London: L. Fulcher & T. W. Hall, 1924. (With T. W. Hall)

References

British philatelists
1865 births
1945 deaths
Signatories to the Roll of Distinguished Philatelists